The taper suspension bridge (also known as the taper principle) is a bridge design patented by James Dredge in 1836.

The principle 

On a conventional suspension bridge the whole deck is suspended on vertical cables, rods or chains from a single cable or chain slung between two supporting towers. The taper suspension bridge that James Dredge devised in the early nineteenth century differs from the conventional suspension bridge design in that it is, in effect, a double cantilever bridge. Each of the opposing cantilever systems are self-supporting. The cantilever half-deck structure of each cantilever is suspended on angled chains from a tapered main chain that hangs from the top of the tower and is attached to the outer end of the half-deck. The main chain taper is achieved by incrementally reducing the number of links stacked across the chain width the further it gets from the support tower.

The advantage of the taper system is that the resulting design is cheaper to build than a conventional suspension bridge of the period because it uses less iron and is quicker to build.

Surviving examples 
Of the 36 known examples of bridges started or completed by Dredge using this design, 7 are known to have survived.

References 

Bridge design